The 2010 North Texas Mean Green football team represented the University of North Texas as a member of the Sun Belt Conference during the 2010 NCAA Division I FBS football season. The Mean Green began the season under fourth-head coach Todd Dodge, who was fired after the team started the season with a 1–6 record. Offensive coordinator Mike Canales was appointed interim head coach and led the team for the final five games of the season. North Texas finished the year with an overall record of 3–9 and a conference mark of 3–5, placing in a three-way tie for sixth in the Sun Belt. The Mean Green played home games on campus at Fouts Field in Denton, Texas. This was the team final season at Fouts Field as the team moved to the newly-opened Apogee Stadium in 2011.

Dodge finished his three-and-a-half-year tenure at North Texas with a record of 6–36. Following the season, former Iowa State University head coach and University of Florida defensive coach Dan McCarney was hired the Mean Green's new head coach.

Schedule

References

North Texas
North Texas Mean Green football seasons
North Texas Mean Green football